Alberto Pestalozza (1851–8 June 1934) composed (with Carlo Tiochet) and published a popular Piedmontese song, "Ciribiribin", in 1898.

Born and died in Turin.

See also
 1898 in music

References
 Alberto Pestalozza on CD Universe
 Alberto Pestalozza on ArchivMusic
 Adam Harvey, Dick Hyman. The Soundtracks of Woody Allen. Publisher: McFarland (March 6, 2007). Page 33. . 

Italian composers
Italian male composers
1851 births
1934 deaths